"The Mom & Pop Store" is the 94th episode of the NBC sitcom Seinfeld. This was the eighth episode for the sixth season. It aired on November 17, 1994. In this episode, George buys a car said to have belonged to Jon Voight (who cameos in the episode as himself). Meanwhile, Kramer takes all of Jerry's sneakers to a "Mom and Pop" shoe repair store, leaving him with nothing but cowboy boots to wear while he tries to figure out whether or not he is invited to Tim Whatley's Thanksgiving party.

Plot
Kramer convinces Jerry to send his sneakers to a "mom and pop" shoe repair store, insisting that it is important to keep such stores from going out of business. Kramer takes all of his sneakers, leaving him only a pair of cowboy boots he was gifted. While at the store, Kramer's nose starts to bleed. When he lies down to stop it, he notices wires hanging out of the ceiling and advises Mom and Pop to call an electrician. Mom and Pop can't afford to bring the electrical installation up to the building code, so they close the store and disappear with all of Jerry's sneakers.

Elaine has a crush on Jerry's dentist, Tim Whatley. Elaine, George, and Kramer all get invitations to Whatley's "Thanksgiving Eve" party, but Jerry is uncertain whether he is invited.

George intends to buy a 1989 Volvo sedan, but the salesman talks him into buying a 1989 LeBaron convertible by telling him it was owned by Jon Voight. While riding in the car, Jerry goes through the glove compartment and discovers a chewed pencil and owner's booklet, showing that the previous owner was a John Voight; Jerry makes fun of George, who kicks him out of the car. He then runs from some muggers but slips because of his boots, hurting his teeth. Because no dentist is seeing patients before Thanksgiving, Jerry decides to crash the party where many dentists will be present.

While walking down the street, Kramer sees Jon Voight. When Kramer tries to ask Voight about George's car and reaches in to Voight’s taxicab, he grabs Kramer's arm and bites him. At work, Mr. Pitt asks Elaine to guess the title of an old song so that he can win a ticket to hold the Woody Woodpecker balloon in the Thanksgiving Parade. Elaine correctly identifies the song and wins the ticket, but must sit through a loud performance by a live band before receiving it. At the party, Elaine is still deafened from the loud music, and inadvertently turns down a date from Whatley because she thought he was just offering her nuts. George and Kramer seek a dentist at the party to match the bite marks on Kramer's arm with those on the chewed pencil. When he hears of George's situation, Whatley realizes the car belonged to Dr. John Voight, a periodontist friend of his. While showing his teeth to a dentist, Jerry accidentally pushes a small statue of the Empire State Building out the window and pierces the Woody Woodpecker balloon with Mr. Pitt under it.

Jerry receives a call from a man who bought a pair of his sneakers from a garage sale in Parsippany, New Jersey. Jerry and Kramer head there to confront Mom and Pop, taking the bus since Jerry's car is in the shop. On the bus ride, Kramer's nose starts bleeding again, similar to Midnight Cowboy.

Production
As with many Seinfeld episodes, "The Mom & Pop Store" was inspired by events in the lives of the writers. Writer Tom Gammill bragged to Jerry Seinfeld that he had purchased a car which was previously owned by Jon Voight; his writing partner Max Pross broke in that he was skeptical that the car had really belonged to Voight. Seinfeld suggested the two of them turn their argument into an episode. According to Gammill and Pross, much of the conversations between George and Jerry were "almost verbatim" recreations of their real debate over the car, including Jerry (Pross in real life) noticing that the owner's manual said "John Voight", though the pencil with teeth marks is fictional.

Jon Voight was on the set for just a few minutes to film his scene. During this time, Gammill asked Voight to look at the car, and Voight said he had never owned it. The same car, including the keys, was used as George's car in both this episode and Season 7's "The Gum." Pross' car has a cameo as the car George originally planned to buy.

The big band songs heard on the radio in the episode, "Honeysuckle Jump" and "Next Stop, Pottersville", are not really from the big band era; they were composed by Jonathan Wolff specifically for this episode. In the Dixieland Deli, another contestant mentions to Elaine that he guessed the name of another (fictional) song, credited to 'Stan Herman', which is a portmanteau of real-life bandleaders Stan Kenton and Woody Herman.

The character Tim Whatley was introduced for this episode. Gammill and Pross based him on a college acquaintance who would specifically not invite certain people in the same circle of friends to his parties.

The sequence with the Woody Woodpecker balloon was inspired by footage of a Woody Woodpecker balloon explosively collapsing during a parade. The production team were unable to obtain the rights to this footage, so they had to recreate it using just a brief shot of Mr. Pitt trying to hold up the balloon.

References

External links 
 

Seinfeld (season 6) episodes
1994 American television episodes
Thanksgiving television episodes